Ernest George "Puffer" Elliott (3 January 1900 – 17 November 1980) was an Australian rules footballer who played with Fitzroy in the Victorian Football League (VFL).

Elliott was a half back flanker in Fitzroy's 1922 VFL premiership winning side. He also played in the 1923 VFL Grand Final, but this time finished on the losing team.

An eight time VFL representative, he made appearances at the 1924 Hobart Carnival.

Elliott coached the Wangaratta Football Club in the Ovens & Murray Football League in 1928 and he later played with Camberwell in the Victorian Football Association (VFA).

References

External links

Ern Elliott's playing statistics from The VFA Project

1900 births
1980 deaths
Fitzroy Football Club players
Fitzroy Football Club Premiership players
Australian rules footballers from Melbourne
One-time VFL/AFL Premiership players
Camberwell Football Club players
People from South Melbourne